Phlebocarya ciliata is a plant in the Haemodoraceae family,
native to Western Australia.

It was first described by Robert Brown in 1810.

Description
Phlebocarya ciliata has flat leaves with leaf blades that are 25-65 cm by 1.6-3.7 mm and have fringed margins (though sometimes only towards the apex or the base). The flowerhead is about 1/3 to 2/3 as long as the leaves. The style is simple and there is one stigma.

It flowers from September to November and grows in heath and woodland in swampy to well-drained sandy soils.

Etymology
The species epithet, ciliata, is a Latin adjective, ciliatus (from cilium, "eyelash") and thus describes the plant as having fine hairs extending from an edge, like an eyelash.

References

External links
 Phlebocarya ciliata occurrence data from Australasian Virtual Herbarium

Flora of Western Australia
Plants described in 1810
Taxa named by Robert Brown (botanist, born 1773)
Haemodoraceae